Francis Gruber (1912–1948) was a French painter, founder of the Nouveau Réalisme school, and a member of the Force nouvelles group.

He was born in Nancy, the son of stained glass artist Jacques Gruber.

He first exhibited at the age of 18. While other artists were becoming more and more abstract, he preferred to paint human figures that were highly sculpted. He was influenced by Hieronymus Bosch and Albrecht Dürer and the Lorraine engraver Jacques Callot. He became friends with the Swiss artist Alberto Giacometti.

He died in Paris.

1912 births
1948 deaths
Artists from Nancy, France
20th-century French painters
20th-century French male artists
French male painters
French Expressionist painters